Brookie may refer to:
A dessert made by combining a brownie and a cookie
A nickname for someone named Brooke
Brook trout, a type of fish native to Eastern North America
Brooklyn Supreme, the largest horse ever recorded
A recipient of a Brooke Owens Fellowship for undergraduate women in aerospace
Brookside, a British soap opera set in Liverpool, England